"Inferno" was a Marvel Comics company-wide crossover storyline in 1989 that mainly involved the mutant titles, namely Uncanny X-Men, X-Factor, X-Terminators, Excalibur, and The New Mutants. The story concerned the corruption of Madelyne Pryor into the Goblin Queen, the final transformation of Illyana Rasputin into the Darkchylde, the demonic transformation of Hobgoblin, and a demonic invasion of New York City.  The series was written by Louise Simonson, Chris Claremont, Steve Engelhart, Gerry Conway, David Michelinie, Ann Nocenti, Walter Simonson, Jon Bogdanove, Terry Austin, and Julianna Jones.

Plot
Two demons from Limbo, S'ym and N'astirh, plan a demonic invasion of Earth. Their plan revolves around Illyana Rasputin of the New Mutants, as her mutant power allows her to open passages between Limbo and Earth. During one of the New Mutants' routine stopovers in Limbo, N'astirh casts a spell blocking Illyana's teleportation power, thus trapping the New Mutants in Limbo with S'ym, who has taken control of Limbo's hordes and is eager to kill the New Mutants in order to solidify his claim to Limbo. Illyana assumes that the entrapment spell was cast by S'ym, and so sees no reason to distrust N'astirh when he advises her that she can return to Earth by embracing her demonic power. She does so and opens a gateway to Manhattan. N'astirh had kidnapped Wiz Kid of the X-Terminators and coerced him into building a spell-casting computer; once Illyana opened the gateway, he uses this computer to cast a spell holding it open.

The city of Manhattan falls under siege, and the Avengers, Fantastic Four, Daredevil, Power Pack, and Spider-Man fend off numerous demons, as well as Hobgoblin, now possessed by a demon, and the mutant-hating Bogeyman, transformed into a monster by N'astirh. Inanimate objects become demonically possessed and begin attacking and devouring people. As shown in Daredevil and X-Men, most residents of Manhattan treat the demonic invasion as a part of normal life in the city. Buses still run, under an all-volunteer force since the drivers had either been eaten or transformed into demons themselves. Subways function, and people ride them willingly, even though some only go into Hell. Stores still sell products. Helicopter tours run. Originally, Spider-Man thinks that the events are illusions caused by Mysterio, however this is proven false when Mysterio is arrested and the strangeness continues 

Meanwhile, N'astirh had made a bargain with Madelyne Pryor, agreeing to locate her son Nathan and manipulate the X-Men into killing the Marauders in exchange for her casting a spell that would make a permanent bridge between Earth and Limbo. To keep his end, N'astirh alters the X-Men's computer systems so that they can use them to locate the Marauders. Driven to bloodthirstiness by N'astirh's Inferno spell, the X-Men attack the Marauders' headquarters, gleefully killing most of them in the ensuing battle. Colossus remains unaffected by this spell, due to the protection of his organic steel armor. However, when he learns what happened to his sister Illyana, he concludes that he can only free his fellow X-Men from Inferno's influence by saving her. In fulfillment of his other half of the bargain, N'astirh liberates Nathan from Mister Sinister's laboratory, where Madelyne learns that she is in fact a clone of Jean Grey created by Sinister.

With their plan fulfilled, N'astirh and S'ym begin fighting each other for leadership of Limbo's hordes (and by extension, rule of both Limbo and Earth). With S'ym gaining the upper hand, N'astirh makes a desperate bid for victory by letting himself be infected with the Transmode Virus. He then merges with Wiz Kid's spell-casting computer, exponentially increasing his magical powers and thus allowing him to bridge permanently between Limbo and Earth without Madelyne Pryor's help. However, Wiz Kid destroys the computer before N'astirh can make use of this power. The explosion reduces N'astirh to ashes, but he is immediately reconstituted by the Transmode Virus.

Finding Illyana, Colossus is horrified to see that she has so completely given in to her demonic side that she is fully covered by her eldritch armor and has demonic horns, legs, and a tail. Ashamed at her brother's reaction, she flees into Limbo and decides to end the demonic invasion by assuming the rule of Limbo. However, her teammate Rahne Sinclair persuades her against this, and she instead gives up her demonic powers by creating a massive stepping disc that banishes most of the demons back to Limbo, including S'ym, then throwing her Soulsword in after them to seal the portal shut. Afterward, the New Mutants find a seven-year-old Illyana inside the husk of her eldritch armor.

However, while Illyana's actions banished all demons native to Limbo except for N'astirh, people and objects who had been demonically possessed remain uncured. N'astirh is destroyed by the combined efforts of the X-Men and X-Factor, but Madelyne Pryor maintains the Inferno spell and threatens to kill her son Nathan as a demonic sacrifice to open the gate between Earth and Limbo. She forcibly links herself to Jean Grey's mind and shows her Madelyne's entire life, including what she learned in Mister Sinister's laboratory. Meanwhile, the X-Men and X-Factor break through her defenses and rescue Nathan. In a fatal bid for revenge, Madelyne wills herself to die, attempting to take Jean with her. However, as Madelyne dies, the fragment of the Phoenix Force that first gave her life emerges and bids Jean to use its power to save herself. Jean does so, thus breaking Madelyne's mental hold on her. New York returns to normal.

However, due to their mind link, part of Madelyne's personality was transferred to Jean, and she becomes determined to get revenge on Mister Sinister, now seeing him as responsible for all her sufferings. The X-Men and X-Factor learn that he took over Professor Xavier's School while its headmaster, Magneto, was occupied with the demonic invasion. Aware of their coming, Mister Sinister waits until they are inside the school and then sets off explosives that demolish the building. However, none of the X-Men or X-Factors are killed or injured by the explosion, and some are not even rendered unconscious. Cyclops blasts Sinister to a smolder. Before his death, Sinister reveals to Cyclops that he is responsible for relocating his orphanage to separate his brother and arranging his marriage to Madelyne.

Despite all of the destruction and death, many human Inferno survivors are convinced it was all a shared hallucination.

Significant issues
 Uncanny X-Men #239-243 
 X-Factor #36-39, Annual #4 (aftermath)
 New Mutants #71-73
 X-Terminators #1-4
 Excalibur #6-7
 Avengers #298-300
 Daredevil #262, 263, 265
 Power Pack #42-44
 Cloak and Dagger (vol. 3) #4
 Fantastic Four #322-324
 Spectacular Spider-Man #146-148
 Web of Spider-Man #47-48
 The Amazing Spider-Man #311-313
 Damage Control #4 (frame story only)
 What If (vol. 2) #6 (alt version)

When collected into a trade paperback, only the portions from The Uncanny X-Men, X-Factor, and The New Mutants were included, and the latter story line was presented separately from the first two.

Background and creation
To avoid losing track of individual characters and plot threads in the story's large cast, editor Bob Harras maintained roughly 20 pages of timelines for how each character would develop over the course of "Inferno".

Sequel
The 2008 miniseries, written by C. B. Cebulski, X-Infernus, and starring Magik, serves as a sequel to "Inferno".

A second sequel, "Fall of the New Mutants", centers around Project Purgatory, a government operation that took the mutant babies used to make the portal to Limbo, who were recovered alive and well, to make an Army controlled base in Limbo, as well as trying to figure out how to activate the powers of the mutant babies.  Four years later (though due to a time dilation effect between Earth and Limbo, 26 years passed for them), Project Purgatory's surviving soldiers, led by General Ulysses, along with the new fully grown and powered surviving Inferno babies, both groups of which are battle scarred, and some of each having what appear to be grafted on demon body parts, have returned to Earth, apparently out to capture Illyana Rasputin.

A spiritual successor to Inferno began in December 2022 entitled "Dark Web", which follows Spider-Man and the X-Men teaming up to fight Ben Reilly and Madelyne Pryor as they attempt to bring Limbo to New York.

Project Purgatory/Inferno Babies members
General Ulysses: A Marine Veteran, he is the commanding officer of Project Purgatory.  A top-notch commander, with great battlefield and command skills that allowed him to lead his forces to survive stranded on their own in Hell for 2 decades.  Notably also appears to have no cybernetic or demonic parts attached to his body, unlike nearly all of the non-mutant members of Project Purgatory. (Killed by Elder Gods)
Doc Noc: Grafted demonic right arm, possessing increased strength. The arm responds to ambient anger and can act against Doc Noc's will. (Implied killed by Cannonball)
Face: Weaponized brain stem. Capable of emitting a highly destructive energy blast from face. Due to the nature of his mutation, he is deaf, blind and mute. Bionic cranio-facial plate allows him to control his blasts.
Scab: Forms durable armor plating when his blood is exposed to oxygen. (Implied killed by Cannonball)
Trista: Speaks backwards, creating a neural trap, allowing her to control those who hear her. (Implied killed by Cypher)
Shauna: Induces paralysis and drowsiness through contact with her leech-like hands; can also "taste" those she holds between her hands.
Toko: Generates impenetrable and immovable forcefield.
Alex: Gelatinous form, capable of engulfing opponents and inhibiting their mutant powers. The composition of his body means he is resistant to injury.
Bob: Blue skinned, can create miniature duplicates from his blood cells.
Russell: Possesses super speed. Often seen wearing a helmet. (Implied killed by Cannonball)
Loca: Possesses demonic and cybernetic body grafts. Adept tracker, capable of sensing and tasting ambient emotional pheromone. (Killed by Danielle Moonstar)
Timothy: Capable of generating thermo-chemical energy from organic exhausts on forearms. (Killed by Face)
Maw: Multiple mouths, each with razor-sharp teeth. (Killed by Face)

"Secret Wars" (2015)
As part of the 2015 "Secret Wars" storyline, there was a mini-series called "Inferno." Its domain in Battleworld is known as Limbo.

Other versions
In the reality of Earth-89112, towards the end of Inferno, Illyana's Soulsword returns to Limbo at the same time as S’ym. The demon uses the sword to return to Earth and, together with the Goblin Queen, kills the X-Men except for Wolverine, who becomes demonized. The demon infestation spreads all over the planet. While the few remaining heroes attempt to devise a plan, the demon hordes attack, killing most of the heroes. Only Dr. Strange and a handful of others escape. Strange eventually discovers Rachel Summers, frozen as a mannequin. He frees her and they rejoin the remaining heroes. Before Strange can summon the Phoenix Force to cleanse the world, the hordes attack again, this time with the aid of Baron Mordo. Many more die until Wolverine returns to the heroes’ side and Baron Mordo betrays his new demonic allies. After the deaths of both S’ym and the Goblin Queen, Rachel summons the Phoenix Force and uses it to purge the demonic infestation from the Earth. The world is reduced to a primitive state and given a new beginning.

Collected editions

References

External links

Comics by Chris Claremont
Comics by Louise Simonson
Comics by Walt Simonson
New Mutants